Abell 2199 is a galaxy cluster in the Abell catalogue featuring the brightest cluster galaxy NGC 6166, a cD galaxy. Abell 2199 is the definition of a Bautz-Morgan type I cluster due to NGC 6166.

See also
 Hercules (Chinese astronomy)
 List of Abell clusters
 List of largest galaxies
 List of nearest galaxies
 List of NGC objects (6001–7000)
 X-ray astronomy

References

 
2199
Galaxy clusters
Hercules (constellation)
Abell richness class 2
Hercules Superclusters